The Transitional National Legislature of South Sudan is the legislature of South Sudan. The Transitional National Legislature consists of the Transitional Council of States (upper house)  and the Transitional National Legislative Assembly (lower house).

The National Legislature has its seat in Juba, South Sudan.

Role

The legislative competencies of the National Government of South Sudan are vested in the National Legislature in respect of all matters assigned to it in Schedules A, C and D of the Transitional Constitution (read together with Schedule E of the Transitional Constitution).
The National Legislative Assembly exercises the following functions
 Overseeing the performance of the National Government institutions;
 Approving plans, programmes and policies of the National Government;
Approving budgets;
 Ratifying international treaties, conventions and agreements;
 Adopting resolutions on matters of public concerns;
 Summoning Ministers to answer questions of members of the Assembly on matters related to their ministries;
 Interrogating Ministers about their performance or the performance of their ministries;
 Approving appointments as required by the Transitional Constitution or the law;
 Casting a vote of no confidence against the Vice President and any Minister;
 Enacting legislation to regulate the conditions and terms of service of the Judiciary and its oversight mechanisms; and
 Performing any other function as determined by the Transitional Constitution or the law.

Eligibility

A candidate for membership of the National Legislature must:

be a South Sudanese citizen;
be at least twenty-one years of age;
be of sound mind;
be literate; and
not have been convicted during the last seven years of an offence involving honesty or moral turpitude.

Members of the National Legislature and the Council of Ministers are eligible for membership of state legislatures or state councils of ministers. A member of the National Legislative Assembly cannot also be a member of the Council of States (and vice versa). The term of the National Legislature shall be four years from July 9, 2011. The Constitution is a transitional Constitution and the terms relating to future general elections are not contained in it. However, there are provisions included for by-elections should vacancies arise during the first four-year period.

History

The establishment of the National Legislature is one of the new institutions created upon the independence of South Sudan in 2011. In substance, it is also a successor to the Southern Sudan Legislative Assembly, itself established in 2005 by the Constitution of Southern Sudan.

General elections will be held in 2023.

See also

Bicameralism
Legislative branch
List of legislatures by country
Politics of South Sudan

References

External links

 

Government of South Sudan
2011 establishments in South Sudan
South Sudan
South Sudan
South Sudan